Italians are a Romance ethnic group native to the Italian geographical region and its neighboring insular territories. Italians share a common culture, history, ancestry and language. Their predecessors differ regionally, but include the ancient Greeks in Magna Graecia, the Etruscans in northern Italy and, most notably, the Romans in central Italy, who helped create and evolved into the modern Italian identity. Legally, Italian nationals are citizens of Italy, regardless of ancestry or nation of residence (in effect, however, Italian nationality is largely based on jus sanguinis) and may be distinguished from ethnic Italians in general or from people of Italian descent without Italian citizenship and ethnic Italians living in territories adjacent to the Italian peninsula without Italian citizenship. The Latin equivalent of the term Italian had been in use for natives of the geographical region since antiquity.

The majority of Italian nationals are native speakers of the country's official language, Italian, or a variety thereof, that is regional Italian. However, many of them also speak a regional or minority language native to Italy, the existence of which predates the national language. Although there is disagreement on the total number, according to UNESCO, there are approximately 30 languages native to Italy, although many are often misleadingly referred to as "Italian dialects".

Since 2017, in addition to the approximately 55 million Italians in Italy (91% of the Italian national population), Italian-speaking autonomous groups are found in neighboring nations; about a half million are in Switzerland, as well as in France, the entire population of San Marino. In addition, there are also clusters of Italian speakers in the former Yugoslavia, primarily in Istria, located between in modern Croatia and Slovenia (see: Istrian Italians), and Dalmatia, located in present-day Croatia and Montenegro (see: Dalmatian Italians). Due to the wide-ranging diaspora following Italian unification in 1861, World War I and World War II, (with over 5 million Italian citizens that live outside of Italy) over 80 million people abroad claim full or partial Italian ancestry. This includes about 60% of Argentina’s population (Italian Argentines), 1/3 of Uruguayans (Italian Uruguayans), 15% of Brazilians (Italian Brazilians, the largest Italian community outside Italy), more than 18 million Italian Americans, and people in other parts of Europe (e.g. Italians in Germany, Italians in France and Italians in the United Kingdom), the American Continent (such as Italian Venezuelans, Italian Canadians, Italian Colombians and Italians in Paraguay, among others), Australasia (Italian Australians and Italian New Zealanders), and to a lesser extent in the Middle East (Italians in the United Arab Emirates).

Italians have influenced and contributed to fields like arts and music, science, technology, fashion, cinema, cuisine, restaurants, sports, jurisprudence, banking and business. Furthermore, Italian people are generally known for their attachment to their locale, expressed in the form of either regionalism or municipalism.

Name

Hypotheses for the etymology of the Latin name "Italia" are numerous. One is that it was borrowed via Greek from the Oscan Víteliú 'land of calves' (cf. Lat vitulus "calf", Umb vitlo "calf"). Greek historian Dionysius of Halicarnassus states this account together with the legend that Italy was named after Italus, mentioned also by Aristotle and Thucydides.

According to Antiochus of Syracuse, the term Italy was used by the Greeks to initially refer only to the southern portion of the Bruttium peninsula corresponding to the modern province of Reggio and part of the provinces of Catanzaro and Vibo Valentia in Southern Italy. Nevertheless, by his time the larger concept of Oenotria and "Italy" had become synonymous and the name also applied to most of Lucania as well. According to Strabo's Geographica, before the expansion of the Roman Republic, the name was used by Greeks to indicate the land between the Strait of Messina and the line connecting the Gulf of Salerno and Gulf of Taranto, corresponding roughly to the current region of Calabria. The Greeks gradually came to apply the name "Italia" to a larger region In addition to the "Greek Italy" in the south, historians have suggested the existence of an "Etruscan Italy" covering variable areas of central Italy.

The borders of Roman Italy are better established. Cato the Elder's Origines, the first work of history composed in Latin, described Italy as the entire peninsula south of the Alps. According to Cato and several Roman authors, the Alps formed the "walls of Italy". In 264 BC, Roman Italy extended from the Arno and Rubicon rivers of the centre-north to the entire south. The northern area of Cisalpine Gaul was occupied by Rome in the 220s BC and became considered geographically and de facto part of Italy, but remained politically and de jure separated. It was legally merged into the administrative unit of Italy in 42 BC by the triumvir Octavian as a ratification of Julius Caesar's unpublished acts (Acta Caesaris). Under Emperor Diocletian the Roman region called "Italia" was further enlarged with the addition in 292 AD of the three big islands of the western Mediterranean Sea: Sicily (with the Maltese archipelago), Sardinia and Corsica, coinciding with the whole Italian geographical region. All its inhabitants were considered Italic and Roman.

The Latin term Italicus was used to describe "a man of Italy" as opposed to a provincial. For example, Pliny the Elder notably wrote in a letter Italicus es an provincialis? meaning "are you an Italian or a provincial?".
The adjective italianus, from which are derived the Italian (and also French and English) name of the Italians, is medieval and was used alternatively with Italicus during the early modern period.

After the fall of the Western Roman Empire, which was caused by the invasion of the Ostrogoths, the Kingdom of Italy was created. After the Lombard invasions, "Italia" was retained as the name for their kingdom, and for its successor kingdom within the Holy Roman Empire, which nominally lasted until 1806, although it had de facto disintegrated due to factional politics pitting the empire against the ascendant city republics in the 13th century.

History

Roman era

The Italian peninsula was divided into a multitude of tribal or ethnic territory prior to the Roman conquest of Italy in the 3rd century BC. After a series of wars between Greeks and Etruscans, the Latins, with Rome as their capital, gained the ascendancy by 272 BC, and completed the conquest of the Italian peninsula by 218 BC.

This period of unification was followed by one of conquest in the Mediterranean, beginning with the First Punic War against Carthage. In the course of the century-long struggle against Carthage, the Romans conquered Sicily, Sardinia and Corsica. Finally, in 146 BC, at the conclusion of the Third Punic War, with Carthage completely destroyed and its inhabitants enslaved, Rome became the dominant power in the Mediterranean.

The process of Italian unification, and the associated Romanization, culminated in 88 BC, when, in the aftermath of the Social War, Rome granted its fellow Italian allies full rights in Roman society, extending Roman citizenship to all fellow Italic peoples.

From its inception, Rome was a republican city-state, but four famous civil conflicts destroyed the Roman Republic: Lucius Cornelius Sulla against Gaius Marius and his son (88–82 BC), Julius Caesar against Pompey (49–45 BC), Marcus Junius Brutus and Gaius Cassius Longinus against Mark Antony and Octavian (43 BC), and Mark Antony against Octavian.

Octavian, the final victor (31 BC), was accorded the title of Augustus by the Senate and thereby became the first Roman Emperor. Augustus created for the first time an administrative region called Italia with inhabitants called "Italicus populus", stretching from the Alps to Sicily: for this reason historians like Emilio Gentile called him Father of Italians.

In the 1st century BC, Italia was still a collection of territories with different political statuses. Some cities, called municipia, had some independence from Rome, while others, the coloniae, were founded by the Romans themselves. Around 7 BC, Augustus divided Italy into eleven regiones.

During the Crisis of the Third Century, the Roman Empire nearly collapsed under the combined pressures of invasions, military anarchy and civil wars, and hyperinflation. In 284, emperor Diocletian restored political stability. The importance of Rome declined, because the city was far from the troubled frontiers. The seats of the Caesars became Augusta Treverorum (on the River Rhine frontier) for Constantius Chlorus and Sirmium (on the River Danube frontier) for Galerius, who also resided at Thessaloniki. Under Diocletian, Italy became the Dioecesis Italiciana, subdivided into thirteen provinces, now including Raetia.

Under Constantine the Great, Italy became the Praetorian prefecture of Italy (praefectura praetoria Italiae), and was subdivided into two dioceses. Diocesis Italia annonaria (Italy of the annona, governed from Milan) and Diocesis Italia Suburbicaria (Italy "under the government of the urbs", i.e. governed from Rome). Christianity became the Roman state religion in AD 380, under Emperor Theodosius I.

The last Western emperor, Romulus Augustulus, was deposed in 476 by a Germanic foederati general in Italy, Odoacer. His defeat marked the end of the Western Roman Empire, and the end of the political unification of Italy until the establishment of the modern Kingdom of Italy in 1861.

The Middle Ages

Odoacer ruled well for 13 years after gaining control of Italy in 476. Then he was attacked and defeated by Theodoric, the king of another Germanic tribe, the Ostrogoths. Theodoric and Odoacer ruled jointly until 493, when Theodoric murdered Odoacer. Theodoric continued to rule Italy with an army of Ostrogoths and a government that was mostly Italian. After the death of Theodoric in 526, the kingdom began to grow weak. By 553, emperor Justinian I expelled the Ostrogoths, and Italy was included into the Byzantine Empire under the Justinian dynasty.

Byzantine rule in much of Italy collapsed by 572 as a result of invasions by another Germanic tribe, the Lombards. Much of the peninsula was now politically dominated by the Kingdom of the Lombards; however, remnants of Byzantine control remained, especially in Southern Italy, where the Byzantine Empire retained control into the 11th century until the Norman conquest of Southern Italy. In addition to the Normans, Arabs conquered parts of Southern Italy in the 9th century, establishing an Emirate of Sicily that lasted until it was also eventually overtaken by the Normans in the 11th century. The subsequent interaction between Latin, Byzantine, Arab, and Norman cultures resulted in the formation of a Norman-Arab-Byzantine culture in Southern Italy.

During the 5th and 6th centuries, the popes increased their influence in both religious and political matters in Italy. It was usually the popes who led attempts to protect Italy from invasion or to soften foreign rule. For about 200 years the popes opposed attempts by the Lombards, who had captured most of Italy, to take over Rome as well. The popes finally defeated the Lombards with the aid of two Frankish kings, Pepin the Short and Charlemagne. Using land won for them by Pepin in 756, the popes established political rule in what were called the Papal States in central Italy.

The Lombards remained a threat to papal power, however, until they were crushed by Charlemagne in 774. Charlemagne added the Kingdom of the Lombards to his vast realm. In recognition of Charlemagne's power, and to cement the church's alliance with him, Charlemagne was crowned emperor of the Romans by Pope Leo III in 800. After Charlemagne's death in 814, his son Louis the Pious succeeded him. Louis divided the empire among his sons, and Frankish Italy became part of Middle Francia, extending as far south as Rome and Spoleto. This Kingdom of Italy became part of the Holy Roman Empire in the 10th century, while southern Italy was under the rule of the Lombard Principality of Benevento or of the Byzantine Empire, in the 12th century absorbed into the Kingdom of Sicily.

Rise of the city-states and the Renaissance

From the 11th century on, Italian cities began to grow rapidly in independence and importance. They became centres of political life, banking, and foreign trade. Some became wealthy, and many, including Florence, Rome, Genoa, Milan, Pisa, Siena and Venice, grew into nearly independent city-states and maritime republics. Each had its own foreign policy and political life. They all resisted, with varying degrees of success, the efforts of noblemen, emperors, and larger foreign powers to control them.

The emergence of identifiable Italian dialects from Vulgar Latin, and as such the possibility of a specifically "Italian" ethnic identity, has no clear-cut date, but began in roughly the 12th century. Modern standard Italian derives from the written vernacular of Tuscan writers of the 12th century. The recognition of Italian vernaculars as literary languages in their own right began with De vulgari eloquentia, an essay written by Dante Alighieri at the beginning of the 14th century.

During the 14th and 15th centuries, some Italian city-states ranked among the most important powers of Europe. Venice, in particular, had become a major maritime power, and the city-states as a group acted as a conduit for goods from the Byzantine and Islamic empires. In this capacity, they provided great impetus to the developing Renaissance, began in Florence in the 14th century, and led to an unparalleled flourishing of the arts, literature, music, and science.

However, the city-states were often troubled by violent disagreements among their citizens. The most famous division was between the Guelphs and Ghibellines. The Guelphs supported supreme rule by the pope, and the Ghibellines favoured the emperor. City-states often took sides and waged war against each other. During the Renaissance, Italy became an even more attractive prize to foreign conquerors. After some city-states asked for outside help in settling disputes with their neighbours, King Charles VIII of France marched into Italy in 1494; he soon withdrew, showing that the Italian peninsula's delicate equilibrium could be taken advantage of. After the Italian Wars, Spain emerged as the dominant force in the region. Venice, Milan, and other city-states retained at least some of their former greatness during this period, as did Savoy-Piedmont, protected by the Alps and well defended by its vigorous rulers.

Italian explorers and navigators from the dominant maritime republics, eager to find an alternative route to the Indies in order to bypass the Ottoman Empire, offered their services to monarchs of Atlantic countries and played a key role in ushering the Age of Discovery and the European colonization of the Americas. The most notable among them were: Christopher Columbus, colonizer in the name of Spain, who is credited with discovering the New World and the opening of the Americas for conquest and settlement by Europeans; John Cabot, sailing for England, who was the first European to set foot in "New Found Land" and explore parts of the North American continent in 1497; Amerigo Vespucci, sailing for Portugal, who first demonstrated in about 1501 that the New World (in particular Brazil) was not Asia as initially conjectured, but a fourth continent previously unknown to people of the Old World (the name of "America" derives from his first name); and Giovanni da Verrazzano, at the service of France, renowned as the first European to explore the Atlantic coast of North America between Florida and New Brunswick in 1524.

The French Revolution and Napoleon

The French Revolution and Napoleon influenced Italy more deeply than they affected any other outside country of Europe. The French Revolution began in 1789 and immediately found supporters among the Italian people. The local Italian rulers, sensing danger in their own country, drew closer to the European kings who opposed France. After the French king was overthrown and France became a republic, secret clubs favouring an Italian republic were formed throughout Italy.

The armies of the French Republic began to move across Europe. In 1796, Napoleon Bonaparte led a French army into northern Italy and drove out the Austrian rulers. Once again, Italy was the scene of battle between the Habsburgs and the French. Wherever France conquered, Italian republics were set up, with constitutions and legal reforms. Napoleon made himself emperor in 1804, and part of northern and central Italy was unified under the name of the Kingdom of Italy, with Napoleon as king. The rest of northern and central Italy was annexed by France. Only Sicily, where the Bourbon king had taken refuge upon the French invasion of Naples, and the island of Sardinia, which had been ceded to the Alpine House of Savoy in 1720 and had remained under their rule ever since, were not under French control.

French domination lasted less than 20 years, and it differed from previous foreign control of the Italian peninsula. In spite of heavy taxation and frequent harshness, the French introduced representative assemblies and new laws that were the same for all parts of the country. For the first time since the days of ancient Rome, Italians of different regions used the same money and served in the same army. Many Italians began to see the possibility of a united Italy free of foreign control.

During the Napoleonic era, in 1797, the first official adoption of the Italian tricolour as a national flag by a sovereign Italian state, the Cispadane Republic, a Napoleonic sister republic of Revolutionary France, took place, on the basis of the events following the French Revolution (1789–1799) which, among its ideals, advocated the national self-determination. This event is celebrated by the Tricolour Day. The Italian national colours appeared for the first time on a tricolour cockade in 1789, anticipating by seven years the first green, white and red Italian military war flag, which was adopted by the Lombard Legion in 1796. The first red, white and green national flag of a sovereign Italian state was adopted on 7 January 1797, when the Fourteenth Parliament of the Cispadane Republic (1797), on the proposal of deputy Giuseppe Compagnoni, decreed "to make universal the ... standard or flag of three colours, green, white, and red ...": For having proposed the green, white and red tricolour flag, Giuseppe Compagnoni is considered the "father of the Italian flag".

Italian unification and the Kingdom of Italy

After the Battle of Waterloo, the reaction set in with the Congress of Vienna allowed the restoration of many of the old rulers and systems under Austrian domination. The concept of nationalism continued strong, however, and sporadic outbreaks led by such inveterate reformers as Giuseppe Mazzini occurred in several parts of the peninsula down to 1848–49. In this context, in 1847, the first public performance of the song Il Canto degli Italiani, the Italian national anthem since 1946, took place. Il Canto degli Italiani, written by Goffredo Mameli set to music by Michele Novaro, is also known as the Inno di Mameli, after the author of the lyrics, or Fratelli d'Italia, from its opening line.

The unification of Italy was brought to a successful conclusion under the guidance of Camillo Benso, conte di Cavour, prime minister of Piedmont. Cavour managed to unite most of Italy under the headship of Victor Emmanuel II of the house of Savoy, and on 17 March 1861, the Kingdom of Italy was proclaimed with Victor Emmanuel II as king. Giuseppe Garibaldi, the popular republican hero of Italy, contributed much to this achievement with the Expedition of the Thousand and to the subsequent incorporation of the Papal States under the Italian monarch. 

Cavour handed Savoy and Nice over to France at the Treaty of Turin, a decision that was the consequence of the Plombières Agreement, on 24 March 1860, an event that caused the Niçard exodus, which was the emigration of a quarter of the Niçard Italians to Italy, and the Niçard Vespers.

Italian troops occupied Rome in 1870, and in July 1871, this formally became the capital of the kingdom. Pope Pius IX, a longtime rival of Italian kings, stated he had been made a "prisoner" inside the Vatican walls and refused to cooperate with the royal administration. Only in 1929 did the Roman Pope accept the unified Italy with Rome as capital.

World War I has been interpreted as completing the process of Italian unification, with the annexation of Trieste, Istria, Trentino-Alto Adige and Zara. After World War I, Italy emerged as one of the four great powers after the victory of the Allies.

In the decades following unification, Italy began creating colonies in Africa, and under Benito Mussolini's fascist regime conquered Ethiopia, founding the Italian Empire in 1936. The population of Italy grew to 45 million in 1940 and the economy, which had been based upon agriculture until that time, started its industrial development, mainly in northern Italy. World War II soon severely damaged Italy and destroyed its colonial power.

The Italian Republic

Between 1945 and 1948, the outlines of a new Italy began to appear. Victor Emmanuel III gave up the throne on 9 May 1946, and his son, Umberto II, became king. On 2 June Italy held its first free election after 20 years of Fascist rule (the so-called Ventennio). Italians chose a republic to replace the monarchy, which had been closely associated with Fascism. They elected a Constituent Assembly, which was formed by the representatives of all the anti-fascist forces that contributed to the defeat of Nazi and Fascist forces during the Italian Civil War, to prepare a new democratic constitution. The Assembly approved the new Italian constitution in 1947, which came into force on 1 January 1948.

Under the Treaty of Peace with Italy, 1947, Istria, Kvarner, most of the Julian March as well as the Dalmatian city of Zara was annexed by Yugoslavia causing the Istrian-Dalmatian exodus, which led to the emigration of between 230,000 and 350,000 of local ethnic Italians (Istrian Italians and Dalmatian Italians), the others being ethnic Slovenians, ethnic Croatians, and ethnic Istro-Romanians, choosing to maintain Italian citizenship.

In 1949 Italy became a member of NATO. The Marshall Plan helped to revive the Italian economy which, until the late 1960s, enjoyed a period of sustained economic growth commonly called the "Economic Miracle". In 1957, Italy was a founding member of the European Economic Community (EEC), which became the European Union (EU) in 1993.

Italy faced several terror attacks between 1992 and 1993 perpetrated by the Sicilian Mafia as a consequence of several life sentences pronounced during the "Maxi Trial", and of the new anti-mafia measures launched by the government. In 1992, two major dynamite attacks killed the judges Giovanni Falcone (23 May in the Capaci bombing) and Paolo Borsellino (19 July in the Via D'Amelio bombing). One year later (May–July 1993), tourist spots were attacked, such as the Via dei Georgofili in Florence, Via Palestro in Milan, and the Piazza San Giovanni in Laterano and Via San Teodoro in Rome, leaving 10 dead and 93 injured and causing severe damage to cultural heritage such as the Uffizi Gallery. The Catholic Church openly condemned the Mafia, and two churches were bombed and an anti-Mafia priest shot dead in Rome. Giovanni Falcone and Paolo Borsellino were named as heroes of the last 60 years in the 13 November 2006 issue of Time.

Culture

Italy is considered one of the birthplaces of Western civilization and a cultural superpower. Italian culture is the culture of the Italians, a Romance ethnic group, and is incredibly diverse spanning the entirety of the Italian peninsula and the islands of Sardinia and Sicily. Italy has been the starting point of phenomena of international impact such as the Roman Republic, Roman Empire, the Roman Catholic Church, the Maritime republics, Romanesque art, Scholasticism, the Renaissance, the Age of Discovery, Mannerism, the Scientific revolution, the Baroque, Neoclassicism, the Risorgimento, Fascism, and European integration.

Italy also became a seat of great formal learning in 1088 with the establishment of the University of Bologna, the oldest university in continuous operation, and the first university in the sense of a higher-learning and degree-awarding institute, as the word universitas was coined at its foundation. Many other Italian universities soon followed. For example, the Schola Medica Salernitana, in southern Italy, was the first medical school in Europe. These great centres of learning presaged the Rinascimento: the European Renaissance began in Italy and was fueled throughout Europe by Italian painters, sculptors, architects, scientists, literature masters and music composers. Italy continued its leading cultural role through the Baroque period and into the Romantic period, when its dominance in painting and sculpture diminished but the Italians re-established a strong presence in music.

Italian explorers and navigators in the 15th and 16th centuries left a perennial mark on human history with the modern "discovery of America", due to the Genoese explorer Christopher Columbus. In addition, the name of "America" derives from the geographer Amerigo Vespucci's first name. Also noted is Marco Polo, explorer of the 13th century, who recorded his 24 years-long travels in the Book of the Marvels of the World, introducing Europeans to Central Asia and China.

The country boasts several world-famous cities. Rome was the ancient capital of the Roman Empire, seat of the Pope of the Catholic Church, capital of reunified Italy and artistic, cultural and cinematographic centre of world relevance. Florence was the heart of the Renaissance, a period of great achievements in the arts at the end of the Middle Ages. Other important cities include Turin, which used to be the capital of Italy, and is now one of the world's great centers of automobile engineering. Milan is the industrial and financial capital of Italy and one of the world's fashion capitals. Venice, former capital of a major financial and maritime power from the Middle Ages to the early modern period, with its intricate canal system attracts tourists from all over the world especially during the Venetian Carnival and the Biennale. Naples, with the largest historic city centre in Europe and the oldest continuously active public opera house in the world (Teatro di San Carlo). Bologna is the main transport hub of the country, as well as the home of a worldwide famous cuisine.

Due to comparatively late national unification, and the historical autonomy of the regions that comprise the Italian peninsula, many traditions and customs of the Italians can be identified by their regions of origin. Despite the political and social isolation of these regions, Italy's contributions to the cultural and historical heritage of the Western world remain immense. Famous elements of Italian culture are its opera and music, its iconic gastronomy and food, which are commonly regarded as amongst the most popular in the world, its cinema (with filmmakers such as Federico Fellini, Michelangelo Antonioni, Mario Monicelli, Sergio Leone, etc.), its collections of priceless works of art and its fashion (Milan and Florence are regarded as some of the few fashion capitals of the world).

National symbols of Italy are the symbols that uniquely identify Italy reflecting its history and culture. They are used to represent the Nation through emblems, metaphors, personifications, allegories, which are shared by the entire Italian people. Some of them are official, i.e. they are recognized by the Italian state authorities, while others are part of the identity of the country without being defined by law.

Traditions of Italy are sets of traditions, beliefs, values, and customs that belongs within the culture of Italian people. These traditions have influenced life in Italy for centuries, and are still practiced in modern times. Italian traditions are directly connected to Italy's ancestors, which says even more about Italian history. Folklore of Italy refers to the folklore and urban legends of Italy. Within the Italian territory, various peoples have followed one another over time, each of which has left its mark on current culture. Some tales also come from Christianization, especially those concerning demons, which are sometimes recognized by Christian demonology. Italian folklore also includes Italian folk dance, Italian folk music and folk heroes.

Women in Italy refers to females who are from (or reside in) Italy. The legal and social status of Italian women has undergone rapid transformations and changes during the past decades. This includes family laws, the enactment of anti-discrimination measures, and reforms to the penal code (in particular with regard to crimes of violence against women). After World War II, women were given the right to vote in 1946 Italian institutional referendum. The new Italian Constitution of 1948 affirmed that women had equal rights. It was not however until the 1970s that women in Italy scored some major achievements with the introduction of laws regulating divorce (1970), abortion (1978), and the approval in 1975 of the new family code. Today, women have the same legal rights as men in Italy, and have mainly the same job, business, and education opportunities.

Italian cuisine is a Mediterranean cuisine consisting of the ingredients, recipes and cooking techniques developed across the Italian Peninsula since antiquity, and later spread around the world together with waves of Italian diaspora. Italian cuisine includes deeply rooted traditions common to the whole country, as well as all the regional gastronomies, different from each other, especially between the north, the centre and the south of Italy, which are in continuous exchange. Many dishes that were once regional have proliferated with variations throughout the country. Italian cuisine offers an abundance of taste, and has influenced several other cuisines around the world, chiefly that of the United States. The most popular dishes and recipes, over the centuries, have often been created by ordinary people more so than by chefs, which is why many Italian recipes are suitable for home and daily cooking, respecting regional specificities, privileging only raw materials and ingredients from the region of origin of the dish and preserving its seasonality.

Philosophy

Over the ages, Italian literature had a vast influence on Western philosophy, beginning with the Greeks and Romans, and going onto Renaissance, The Enlightenment and modern philosophy.
Italian Medieval philosophy was mainly Christian, and included several important philosophers and theologians such as St Thomas Aquinas. Aquinas was the student of Albert the Great, a brilliant Dominican experimentalist, much like the Franciscan, Roger Bacon of Oxford in the 13th century. Aquinas reintroduced Aristotelian philosophy to Christianity. He believed that there was no contradiction between faith and secular reason. He believed that Aristotle had achieved the pinnacle in the human striving for truth and thus adopted Aristotle's philosophy as a framework in constructing his theological and philosophical outlook. He was a professor at the prestigious University of Paris.

Italy was also affected by the Enlightenment, a movement which was a consequence of the Renaissance and changed the road of Italian philosophy. Followers of the group often met to discuss in private salons and coffeehouses, notably in the cities of Milan, Rome and Venice. Cities with important universities such as Padua, Bologna and Naples, however, also remained great centres of scholarship and the intellect, with several philosophers such as Giambattista Vico (1668–1744) (who is widely regarded as being the founder of modern Italian philosophy) and Antonio Genovesi. Italian society also dramatically changed during the Enlightenment, with rulers such as Leopold II of Tuscany abolishing the death penalty. The church's power was significantly reduced, and it was a period of great thought and invention, with scientists such as Alessandro Volta and Luigi Galvani discovering new things and greatly contributing to Western science. Cesare Beccaria was also one of the greatest Italian Enlightenment writers and is now considered one of the fathers of classical criminal theory as well as modern penology. Beccaria is famous for his masterpiece On Crimes and Punishments (1764), a treatise (later translated into 22 languages) that served as one of the earliest prominent condemnations of torture and the death penalty and thus a landmark work in anti-death penalty philosophy.

Some of the most prominent philosophies and ideologies in Italy during the late 19th and 20th centuries include anarchism, communism, socialism, futurism, fascism, and Christian democracy. Antonio Rosmini, instead, was the founder of Italian idealism. Both futurism and fascism (in its original form, now often distinguished as Italian fascism) were developed in Italy at this time. From the 1920s to the 1940s, Italian Fascism was the official philosophy and ideology of the Italian government led by Benito Mussolini. Giovanni Gentile was one of the most significant 20th-century Idealist/Fascist philosophers. Meanwhile, anarchism, communism, and socialism, though not originating in Italy, took significant hold in Italy during the early 20th century, with the country producing numerous significant Italian anarchists, socialists, and communists. In addition, anarcho-communism first fully formed into its modern strain within the Italian section of the First International. Antonio Gramsci remains an important philosopher within Marxist and communist theory, credited with creating the theory of cultural hegemony.

Early Italian feminists include Sibilla Aleramo, Alaide Gualberta Beccari, and Anna Maria Mozzoni, though proto-feminist philosophies had previously been touched upon by earlier Italian writers such as Christine de Pizan, Moderata Fonte, and Lucrezia Marinella. Italian physician and educator Maria Montessori is credited with the creation of the philosophy of education that bears her name, an educational philosophy now practiced throughout the world. Giuseppe Peano was one of the founders of analytic philosophy and contemporary philosophy of mathematics. Recent analytic philosophers include Carlo Penco, Gloria Origgi, Pieranna Garavaso and Luciano Floridi.

Literature

Formal Latin literature began in 240 BC, when the first stage play was performed in Rome. Latin literature was, and still is, highly influential in the world, with numerous writers, poets, philosophers, and historians, such as Pliny the Elder, Pliny the Younger, Virgil, Horace, Propertius, Ovid and Livy. The Romans were also famous for their oral tradition, poetry, drama and epigrams. In early years of the 13th century, St. Francis of Assisi was considered the first Italian poet by literary critics, with his religious song Canticle of the Sun.

Italian literature may be unearthed back to the Middle Ages, with the most significant poets of the period being Dante Alighieri, Petrarch, and Giovanni Boccaccio. During the Renaissance, humanists such as Leonardo Bruni, Coluccio Salutati and Niccolò Machiavelli were great collectors of antique manuscripts. Many worked for the organized Church and were in holy orders (like Petrarch), while others were lawyers and chancellors of Italian cities, like Petrarch's disciple, Salutati, the Chancellor of Florence, and thus had access to book copying workshops.

In the 18th century, the political condition of the Italian states began to improve, and philosophers disseminated their writings and ideas throughout Europe during the Age of Enlightenment. Apostolo Zeno and Metastasio are two of the notable figures of the age. Carlo Goldoni, a Venetian playwright and librettist, created the comedy of character. The leading figure of the 18th-century Italian literary revival was Giuseppe Parini.

One of the most remarkable poets of the early 19th and 20th century writers was Giacomo Leopardi, who is widely acknowledged to be one of the most radical and challenging thinkers of the 19th century. The main instigator of the reform was the Italian poet and novelist Alessandro Manzoni, notable for being the author of the historical novel I promessi sposi (The Betrothed, 1827–1842). Italo Svevo, the author of La coscienza di Zeno (1923), and Luigi Pirandello (winner of the 1934 Nobel Prize in Literature), who explored the shifting nature of reality in his prose fiction and such plays as Sei personaggi in cerca d'autore (Six Characters in Search of an Author, 1921). Federigo Tozzi and Giuseppe Ungaretti were well-known novelists, critically appreciated only in recent years, and regarded one of the forerunners of existentialism in the European novel.

Modern literary figures and Nobel laureates are Gabriele D'Annunzio from 1889 to 1910, nationalist poet Giosuè Carducci in 1906, realist writer Grazia Deledda in 1926, modern theatre author Luigi Pirandello in 1936, short stories writer Italo Calvino in 1960, poets Salvatore Quasimodo in 1959 and Eugenio Montale in 1975, Umberto Eco in 1980, and satirist and theatre author Dario Fo in 1997.

Theatre 

Italian theatre originates from the Middle Ages, with its background dating back to the times of the ancient Greek colonies of Magna Graecia, in Southern Italy, the theatre of the Italic peoples and the theatre of ancient Rome. It can therefore be assumed that there were two main lines of which the ancient Italian theatre developed in the Middle Ages. The first, consisting of the dramatization of Catholic liturgies and of which more documentation is retained, and the second, formed by pagan forms of spectacle such as the staging for city festivals, the court preparations of the jesters and the songs of the troubadours. The Renaissance theatre marked the beginning of the modern theatre due to the rediscovery and study of the classics, the ancient theatrical texts were recovered and translated, which were soon staged at the court and in the curtensi halls, and then moved to real theatre. In this way the idea of ​​theatre came close to that of today: a performance in a designated place in which the public participates. In the late 15th century two cities were important centers for the rediscovery and renewal of theatrical art: Ferrara and Rome. The first, vital center of art in the second half of the fifteenth century, saw the staging of some of the most famous Latin works by Plautus, rigorously translated into Italian.

During the 16th century and on into the 18th century, Commedia dell'arte was a form of improvisational theatre, and it is still performed today. Travelling troupes of players would set up an outdoor stage and provide amusement in the form of juggling, acrobatics and, more typically, humorous plays based on a repertoire of established characters with a rough storyline, called canovaccio. Plays did not originate from written drama but from scenarios called lazzi, which were loose frameworks that provided the situations, complications, and outcome of the action, around which the actors would improvise. The characters of the commedia usually represent fixed social types and stock characters, each of which has a distinct costume, such as foolish old men, devious servants, or military officers full of false bravado. The main categories of these characters include servants, old men, lovers, and captains.

The Ballet dance genre also originated in Italy. It began during the Italian Renaissance court as an outgrowth of court pageantry, where aristocratic weddings were lavish celebrations. Court musicians and dancers collaborated to provide elaborate entertainment for them. At first, ballets were woven in to the midst of an opera to allow the audience a moment of relief from the dramatic intensity. By the mid-seventeenth century, Italian ballets in their entirety were performed in between the acts of an opera. Over time, Italian ballets became part of theatrical life: ballet companies in Italy's major opera houses employed an average of four to twelve dancers; in 1815 many companies employed anywhere from eighty to one hundred dancers.

Law and justice
Since the Roman Empire, most western contributions to Western legal culture was the emergence of a class of Roman jurists. During the Middle Ages, Thomas Aquinas, the most influential Western scholar of the period, integrated the theory of natural law with the notion of an eternal and Biblical law. During the Renaissance, Prof. Alberico Gentili, the founder of the science of international law, authored the first treatise on public international law and separated secular law from canon law and Catholic theology. Enlightenment's greatest legal theorists, Cesare Beccaria, Giambattista Vico and Francesco Mario Pagano, are well remembered for their legal works, particularly on criminal law.
Francesco Carrara, an advocate of abolition of the death penalty, was one of the foremost European criminal lawyers of the 19th century. During the last periods, numerous Italians have been recognised as the prominent prosecutor magistrates.

Science and technology

Italians have been the central figures of countless inventions and discoveries and they made many predominant contributions to various fields. During the Renaissance, Italian polymaths such as Leonardo da Vinci (1452–1519), Michelangelo (1475–1564) and Leon Battista Alberti (1404–72) made important contributions to a variety of fields, including biology, architecture, and engineering. Galileo Galilei (1564–1642), a physicist, mathematician and astronomer, played a major role in the Scientific Revolution. His achievements include the invention of the thermometer and key improvements to the telescope and consequent astronomical observations, and ultimately the triumph of Copernicanism over the Ptolemaic model. Other astronomers such as Giovanni Domenico Cassini (1625–1712) and Giovanni Schiaparelli (1835–1910) made many important discoveries about the Solar System.

In biology, Francesco Redi was the first to challenge the theory of spontaneous generation by demonstrating that maggots come from eggs of flies and he described 180 parasites in detail; Marcello Malpighi founded microscopic anatomy; Lazzaro Spallanzani conducted important research in bodily functions, animal reproduction, and cellular theory; Camillo Golgi, whose many achievements include the discovery of the Golgi complex, paved the way to the acceptance of the Neuron doctrine; Rita Levi-Montalcini discovered the nerve growth factor (awarded 1986 Nobel Prize in Physiology or Medicine); Angelo Ruffini first described the Ruffini endings and was known for his work in histology and embryology; Filippo Pacini discovered the Pacinian corpuscles and was the first to isolate the cholera bacillus Vibrio cholerae in 1854, before Robert Koch's more widely accepted discoveries 30 years later.

Prominent scientists, engineers and inventors were: Amedeo Avogadro (most noted for his contributions to molecular theory, in particular Avogadro's law and the Avogadro constant), Evangelista Torricelli (inventor of the barometer), Alessandro Volta (inventor of the electric battery), Guglielmo Marconi (inventor of radio), Antonio Meucci (known for developing a voice-communication apparatus, often credited as the inventor of the first telephone before even Alexander Graham Bell), Galileo Ferraris (one of the pioneers of AC power system, invented the first induction motor), Eugenio Barsanti and Felice Matteucci (as inventors of the first version of the internal combustion engine in 1853).

In chemistry, Giulio Natta, the inventor of the first catalyst for the production of isotactic propylene and among the fathers of macromolecular chemistry, in 1963 received the Nobel prize for chemistry, along with Karl Ziegler, for work on high polymers.

In physics, Enrico Fermi, a Nobel prize laureate, led the team in Chicago that built the first nuclear reactor and is also noted for his many other contributions to physics, including the co-development of the quantum theory. He and a number of Italian physicists were forced to leave Italy in the 1930s by Fascist laws against Jews, including Emilio G. Segrè (1905–89) (who discovered the elements technetium and astatine, and the antiproton), and Bruno Rossi (1905–93), a pioneer in Cosmic Rays and X-ray astronomy.

Other notable physicists were also Ettore Majorana (who discovered the Majorana fermions), Giuseppe Occhialini (who received the Wolf Prize in Physics for the discovery of the pion or pi-meson decay in 1947) and Carlo Rubbia (1984 Nobel Prize in Physics for work leading to the discovery of the W and Z particles at CERN).

Mathematics

During the Middle Ages, Leonardo Fibonacci, the most talented Western mathematician of the Middle Ages, introduced the Hindu–Arabic numeral system to the Western world. He also introduced the sequence of Fibonacci numbers, which he used as an example in Liber Abaci. Gerolamo Cardano established the foundation of probability and introduced the binomial coefficients and the binomial theorem; he also invented several mechanical devices. During the Renaissance, Luca Pacioli introduced accounting to the world, publishing the first work on Double-entry bookkeeping system. Galileo Galilei made several significant advances in mathematics. Bonaventura Cavalieri's works partially anticipated integral calculus and popularized logarithms in Italy.

Jacopo Riccati, who was also a jurist, invented the Riccati equation. Maria Gaetana Agnesi, the first woman to write a mathematics handbook, become the first woman mathematics professor at a university. Gian Francesco Malfatti, posed the problem of carving three circular columns out of a triangular block of marble, using as much of the marble as possible, and conjectured that three mutually-tangent circles inscribed within the triangle would provide the optimal solution, which are now known as Malfatti circles. Paolo Ruffini is credited for his innovative work in mathematics, creating Ruffini's rule and co-creating the Abel–Ruffini theorem. Joseph-Louis Lagrange, who was one of the most influential mathematicians of his time, made essential contributions to analysis, number theory, and both classical and celestial mechanics.

Gregorio Ricci-Curbastro invented tensor calculus and absolute differential calculus, which were popularized in a work he co-wrote with Tullio Levi-Civita, and used in the development of the theory of relativity; Ricci-Curbastro also wrote meaningful works on algebra, infinitesimal analysis, and papers on the theory of real numbers. Giuseppe Peano, was a founder of mathematical logic and set theory; alongside John Venn, he drew the first Venn diagram. Beniamino Segre is one of the major contributors to algebraic geometry and one of the founders of finite geometry. Ennio de Giorgi, a Wolf Prize in Mathematics recipient in 1990, solved Bernstein's problem about minimal surfaces and the 19th Hilbert problem on the regularity of solutions of elliptic partial differential equations.

Politics

The politics of Italy are conducted through a parliamentary republic with a multi-party system. Italy has been a democratic republic since 2 June 1946, when the monarchy was abolished by popular referendum and a constituent assembly, which was formed by the representatives of all the anti-fascist forces that contributed to the defeat of Nazi and Fascist forces during the Italian Civil War, was elected to draft a constitution, which was promulgated on 1 January 1948.

Executive power is exercised by the Council of Ministers, which is led by the Prime Minister, officially referred to as "President of the Council" (Presidente del Consiglio). Legislative power is vested primarily in the two houses of Parliament and secondarily in the Council of Ministers, which can introduce bills and holds the majority in both houses. The judiciary is independent of the executive and the legislative branches. It is headed by the High Council of the Judiciary, a body presided over by the President, who is the head of state, though this position is separate from all branches.

Economy

The economy of Italy is a highly developed social market economy. It is the third-largest national economy in the European Union, the 10th-largest in the world by nominal GDP, and the 12th-largest by GDP (PPP). Italy is a founding member of the European Union, the Eurozone, the OECD, the G7 and the G20; it is the eighth-largest exporter in the world, with $611 billion exported in 2021. Its closest trade ties are with the other countries of the European Union, with whom it conducts about 59% of its total trade. The largest trading partners, in order of market share in exports, are Germany (12.5%), France (10.3%), the United States (9%), Spain (5.2%), the United Kingdom (5.2%) and Switzerland (4.6%).

In the post-World War II period, Italy saw a transformation from an agricultural based economy which had been severely affected by the consequences of the World Wars, into one of the world's most advanced nations, and a leading country in world trade and exports. Italy is the world's seventh-largest manufacturing country, characterised by a smaller number of global multinational corporations than other economies of comparable size and many dynamic small and medium-sized enterprises, notoriously clustered in several industrial districts, which are the backbone of the Italian industry. Italy is a large manufacturer and exporter of a significant variety of products. Its products include machinery, vehicles, pharmaceuticals, furniture, food and clothing.

Cuisine

Italian cuisine is a Mediterranean cuisine consisting of the ingredients, recipes and cooking techniques developed across the Italian Peninsula since antiquity, and later spread around the world together with waves of Italian diaspora. Italian cuisine includes deeply rooted traditions common to the whole country, as well as all the regional gastronomies, different from each other, especially between the north, the centre and the south of Italy, which are in continuous exchange. Many dishes that were once regional have proliferated with variations throughout the country. Italian cuisine offers an abundance of taste, and has influenced several other cuisines around the world, chiefly that of the United States. Italian cuisine has developed through centuries of social and political changes, it has its roots in ancient Rome. 

One of the main characteristics of Italian cuisine is its simplicity, with many dishes made up of few ingredients, and therefore Italian cooks often rely on the quality of the ingredients, rather than the complexity of preparation. The most popular dishes and recipes, over the centuries, have often been created by ordinary people more so than by chefs, which is why many Italian recipes are suitable for home and daily cooking, respecting regional specificities, privileging only raw materials and ingredients from the region of origin of the dish and preserving its seasonality.

Visual art

The history of Italian visual arts is significant to the history of Western painting. Roman art was influenced by Greece and can in part be taken as a descendant of ancient Greek painting. Roman painting does have its own unique characteristics. The only surviving Roman paintings are wall paintings, many from villas in Campania, in Southern Italy. Such paintings can be grouped into four main "styles" or periods and may contain the first examples of trompe-l'œil, pseudo-perspective, and pure landscape.

Panel painting becomes more common during the Romanesque period, under the heavy influence of Byzantine icons. Towards the middle of the 13th century, Medieval art and Gothic painting became more realistic, with the beginnings of interest in the depiction of volume and perspective in Italy with Cimabue and then his pupil Giotto. From Giotto onwards, the treatment of composition in painting became much more free and innovative.

The Italian Renaissance is said by many to be the golden age of painting; roughly spanning the 14th through the mid-17th centuries with a significant influence also out of the borders of modern Italy. In Italy artists like Paolo Uccello, Fra Angelico, Masaccio, Piero della Francesca, Andrea Mantegna, Filippo Lippi, Giorgione, Tintoretto, Sandro Botticelli, Leonardo da Vinci, Michelangelo, Raphael, Giovanni Bellini, and Titian took painting to a higher level through the use of perspective, the study of human anatomy and proportion, and through their development of refined drawing and painting techniques. Michelangelo was active as a sculptor from about 1500 to 1520; works include his David, Pietà, Moses. Other Renaissance sculptors include Lorenzo Ghiberti, Luca Della Robbia, Donatello, Filippo Brunelleschi and Andrea del Verrocchio.

In the 15th and 16th centuries, the High Renaissance gave rise to a stylised art known as Mannerism. In place of the balanced compositions and rational approach to perspective that characterised art at the dawn of the 16th century, the Mannerists sought instability, artifice, and doubt. The unperturbed faces and gestures of Piero della Francesca and the calm Virgins of Raphael are replaced by the troubled expressions of Pontormo and the emotional intensity of El Greco.

In the 17th century, among the greatest painters of Italian Baroque are Caravaggio, Annibale Carracci, Artemisia Gentileschi, Mattia Preti, Carlo Saraceni and Bartolomeo Manfredi. Subsequently, in the 18th century, Italian Rococo was mainly inspired by French Rococo, since France was the founding nation of that particular style, with artists such as Giovanni Battista Tiepolo and Canaletto. Italian Neoclassical sculpture focused, with Antonio Canova's nudes, on the idealist aspect of the movement.

In the 19th century, major Italian Romantic painters were Francesco Hayez, Giuseppe Bezzuoli and Francesco Podesti. Impressionism was brought from France to Italy by the Macchiaioli, led by Giovanni Fattori, and Giovanni Boldini; Realism by Gioacchino Toma and Giuseppe Pellizza da Volpedo. In the 20th century, with Futurism, primarily through the works of Umberto Boccioni and Giacomo Balla, Italy rose again as a seminal country for artistic evolution in painting and sculpture. Futurism was succeeded by the metaphysical paintings of Giorgio de Chirico, who exerted a strong influence on the Surrealists and generations of artists to follow like Bruno Caruso and Renato Guttuso.

Architecture

As Italy is home to the greatest number of UNESCO World Heritage Sites (58) to date and it is home to half the world's great art treasures, Italians are known for their significant architectural achievements, such as the construction of arches, domes and similar structures during ancient Rome, the founding of the Renaissance architectural movement in the late-14th to 16th centuries, and being the homeland of Palladianism, a style of construction which inspired movements such as that of Neoclassical architecture, and influenced the designs which noblemen built their country houses all over the world, notably in the UK, Australia and the US during the late 17th to early 20th centuries. Several of the finest works in Western architecture, such as the Colosseum, the Milan Cathedral and Florence cathedral, the Leaning Tower of Pisa and the building designs of Venice are found in Italy.

Italian architecture has also widely influenced the architecture of the world. British architect Inigo Jones, inspired by the designs of Italian buildings and cities, brought back the ideas of Italian Renaissance architecture to 17th-century England, being inspired by Andrea Palladio. Additionally, Italianate architecture, popular abroad since the 19th century, was used to describe foreign architecture which was built in an Italian style, especially modelled on Renaissance architecture.

Italian modern and contemporary architecture refers to architecture in Italy during 20th and 21st centuries. During the Fascist period the so-called "Novecento movement" flourished, with figures such as Gio Ponti, Peter Aschieri, Giovanni Muzio. This movement was based on the rediscovery of imperial Rome. Marcello Piacentini, who was responsible for the urban transformations of several cities in Italy, and remembered for the disputed Via della Conciliazione in Rome, devised a form of "simplified Neoclassicism".

The fascist architecture (shown perfectly in the EUR buildings) was followed by the Neoliberty style (seen in earlier works of Vittorio Gregotti) and Brutalist architecture (Torre Velasca in Milan group BBPR, a residential building via Piagentina in Florence, Leonardo Savioli and works by Giancarlo De Carlo).

Music

From folk music to classical, music has always played an important role in Italian culture. Instruments associated with classical music, including the piano and violin, were invented in Italy, and many of the prevailing classical music forms, such as the symphony, concerto, and sonata, can trace their roots back to innovations of 16th- and 17th-century Italian music.
Italians invented many of the musical instruments, including the piano and violin.

Most notable Italians composers include the Giovanni Pierluigi da Palestrina, Claudio Monteverdi, the Baroque composers Scarlatti, Corelli and Vivaldi, the Classical composers Paganini and Rossini, and the Romantic composers Verdi and Puccini, whose operas, including La bohème, Tosca, Madama Butterfly, and Turandot, are among the most frequently worldwide performed in the standard repertoire. Modern Italian composers such as Berio and Nono proved significant in the development of experimental and electronic music. While the classical music tradition still holds strong in Italy, as evidenced by the fame of its innumerable opera houses, such as La Scala of Milan and San Carlo of Naples, and performers such as the pianist Maurizio Pollini and the late tenor Luciano Pavarotti, Italians have been no less appreciative of their thriving contemporary music scene.

Italians are amply known as the mothers of opera. Italian opera was believed to have been founded in the early 17th century, in Italian cities such as Mantua and Venice. Later, works and pieces composed by native Italian composers of the 19th and early 20th centuries, such as Rossini, Bellini, Donizetti, Verdi and Puccini, are among the most famous operas ever written and today are performed in opera houses across the world. La Scala operahouse in Milan is also renowned as one of the best in the world. Famous Italian opera singers include Enrico Caruso and Alessandro Bonci.

Introduced in the early 1920s, jazz took a particularly strong foothold among Italians, and remained popular despite the xenophobic cultural policies of the Fascist regime. Today, the most notable centres of jazz music in Italy include Milan, Rome, and Sicily. Later, Italy was at the forefront of the progressive rock movement of the 1970s, with bands like PFM and Goblin. Italy was also an important country in the development of disco and electronic music, with Italo disco, known for its futuristic sound and prominent usage of synthesizers and drum machines, being one of the earliest electronic dance genres, as well as European forms of disco aside from Euro disco (which later went on to influence several genres such as Eurodance and Nu-disco).

Producers and songwriters such as Giorgio Moroder, who won three Academy Awards for his music, were highly influential in the development of EDM (electronic dance music). Today, Italian pop music is represented annually with the Sanremo Music Festival, which served as inspiration for the Eurovision song contest, and the Festival of Two Worlds in Spoleto. Singers such as pop diva Mina, classical crossover artist Andrea Bocelli, Grammy winner Laura Pausini, and European chart-topper Eros Ramazzotti have attained international acclaim.

Cinema

Since the development of the Italian film industry in the early 1900s, Italian filmmakers and performers have, at times, experienced both domestic and international success, and have influenced film movements throughout the world. The history of Italian cinema began a few months after the Lumière brothers began motion picture exhibitions. The first Italian director is considered to be Vittorio Calcina, a collaborator of the Lumière Brothers, who filmed Pope Leo XIII in 1896. In the 1910s the Italian film industry developed rapidly. Cabiria, a 1914 Italian epic film directed by Giovanni Pastrone, is considered the most famous Italian silent film. It was also the first film in history to be shown in the White House. The oldest European avant-garde cinema movement, Italian futurism, took place in the late 1910s.

After a period of decline in the 1920s, the Italian film industry was revitalized in the 1930s with the arrival of sound film. A popular Italian genre during this period, the Telefoni Bianchi, consisted of comedies with glamorous backgrounds. Calligrafismo was instead in a sharp contrast to Telefoni Bianchi-American style comedies and is rather artistic, highly formalistic, expressive in complexity and deals mainly with contemporary literary material. 

A new era took place at the end of World War II, with the Italian film that was widely recognised and exported until an artistic decline around the 1980s. Notable Italian film directors from this period include Vittorio De Sica, Federico Fellini, Sergio Leone, Pier Paolo Pasolini, Luchino Visconti, Michelangelo Antonioni, Dussio Tessari and Roberto Rossellini; some of these are recognised among the greatest and most influential filmmakers of all time. Movies include world cinema treasures such as Bicycle Thieves, La dolce vita, 8½, The Good, the Bad and the Ugly, and Once Upon a Time in the West. The mid-1940s to the early 1950s was the heyday of neorealist films, reflecting the poor condition of post-war Italy. Actresses such as Sophia Loren, Giulietta Masina and Gina Lollobrigida achieved international stardom during this period.

Since the early 1960s they also popularized a large number of genres and subgenres, such as Peplum, Macaroni Combat, Musicarello, Poliziotteschi and Commedia sexy all'italiana. The Spaghetti Western achieved popularity in the mid-1960s, peaking with Sergio Leone's Dollars Trilogy, which featured enigmatic scores by composer Ennio Morricone. Erotic Italian thrillers, or Giallos, produced by directors such as Mario Bava and Dario Argento in the 1970s, influenced the horror genre worldwide. In recent years, directors such as Ermanno Olmi, Bernardo Bertolucci, Giuseppe Tornatore, Gabriele Salvatores, Roberto Benigni, Matteo Garrone, Paolo Sorrentino and Luca Guadagnino brought critical acclaim back to Italian cinema.

The Venice International Film Festival, awarding the "Golden Lion" and held annually since 1932, is the oldest film festival in the world and one of the "Big Three" alongside Cannes and Berlin. The country is also famed for its prestigious David di Donatello. Italy is the most awarded country at the Academy Awards for Best Foreign Language Film, with 14 awards won, 3 Special Awards and 28 nominations. , Italian films have also won 12 Palmes d'Or (the second-most of any country), 11 Golden Lions and 7 Golden Bears.

Fashion and design 

Italian fashion has a long tradition. Milan, Florence and Rome are Italy's main fashion capitals. According to Top Global Fashion Capital Rankings 2013 by Global Language Monitor, Rome ranked sixth worldwide when Milan was twelfth. Previously, in 2009, Milan was declared as the "fashion capital of the world" by Global Language Monitor itself. Currently, Milan and Rome, annually compete with other major international centres, such as Paris, New York, London, and Tokyo.

The Italian fashion industry is one of the country's most important manufacturing sectors. The majority of the older Italian couturiers are based in Rome. However, Milan is seen as the fashion capital of Italy because many well-known designers are based there and it is the venue for the Italian designer collections. Major Italian fashion labels, such as Gucci, Armani, Prada, Versace, Valentino, Dolce & Gabbana, Missoni, Fendi, Moschino, Max Mara, Trussardi, Benetton, and Ferragamo, to name a few, are regarded as among the finest fashion houses in the world. 

Accessory and jewelry labels, such as Bulgari, Luxottica, Buccellati have been founded in Italy and are internationally acclaimed, and Luxottica is the world's largest eyewear company. Also, the fashion magazine Vogue Italia, is considered one of the most prestigious fashion magazines in the world. The talent of young, creative fashion is also promoted, as in the ITS young fashion designer competition in Trieste.

Italy is also prominent in the field of design, notably interior design, architectural design, industrial design, and urban design. The country has produced some well-known furniture designers, such as Gio Ponti and Ettore Sottsass, and Italian phrases such as Bel Disegno and Linea Italiana have entered the vocabulary of furniture design. Examples of classic pieces of Italian white goods and pieces of furniture include Zanussi's washing machines and fridges, the "New Tone" sofas by Atrium, and the post-modern bookcase by Ettore Sottsass, inspired by Bob Dylan's song "Stuck Inside of Mobile with the Memphis Blues Again".

Italy is recognized as being a worldwide trendsetter and leader in design. Italy today still exerts a vast influence on urban design, industrial design, interior design, and fashion design worldwide. Today, Milan and Turin are the nation's leaders in architectural design and industrial design. The city of Milan hosts the FieraMilano, Europe's biggest design fair. Milan also hosts major design and architecture-related events and venues, such as the Fuori Salone and the Salone del Mobile, and has been home to the designers Bruno Munari, Lucio Fontana, Enrico Castellani, and Piero Manzoni.

Sport

Italians have a long tradition in sport. In numerous sports, both individual and team, Italy has been very successful.

Association football is the most popular sport in Italy.
Italy is one of the most successful national teams in association football having four FIFA World Cups, two UEFA European Championship and one Olympic tournament.
Amongst the players who won the FIFA World Cup there are Giuseppe Meazza, Silvio Piola (to date the highest goalscorer in Italian first league history), Dino Zoff, Paolo Rossi, Marco Tardelli, Bruno Conti, Gianluigi Buffon, Fabio Cannavaro, Alessandro Del Piero, Andrea Pirlo and Francesco Totti.
Amongst those who did not win the World Cup but laureated as European champions are Gianni Rivera, Luigi Riva (to date Italy's leading scorer of all time), Sandro Salvadore, Giacomo Bulgarelli, Pietro Anastasi and Giacinto Facchetti.
Other prominent players who achieved success at club level are Giampiero Boniperti, Romeo Benetti, Roberto Boninsegna, Roberto Bettega, Roberto Baggio and Paolo Maldini.
Of the above-mentioned, the goalkeeper Dino Zoff, who served in the National team from 1968 to 1983, is to date the only Italian player to have won both the European championship (in 1968) and the FIFA World Cup (in 1982), apart from being the oldest winner ever of the World Cup.
At club level, to date Italy has won a total of 12 European Cup / Champions' Leagues, 9 UEFA Cups / UEFA Europa League and 7 UEFA Cup Winners' Cup.

Motorcycle racers such as Giacomo Agostini and Valentino Rossi are recognized as some of the greatest sportstars of all time. Federica Pellegrini, one of the few female swimmers to have set world records in more than one event has been one of the world's most successful swimmers. Italian athletes have won 549 medals at the Summer Olympic Games, and another 114 medals at the Winter Olympic Games. Jessica Rossi scored a Shooting sport world record of 75 in the qualification and a world record of 99. As for Olympic games, 663 Italians won medals, particularly in Swordsmanship, which makes them the 6th most successful ethnic group in Olympic history. There are more than 2,000,000 Italian skiers in the world, most of them, thanks to the presence of the Alps and the Apennines, in Northern and in Central Italy. Italian skiers received good results in the Winter Olympic Games, World Cup, and World Championships.

Italians are the second of the most who have won the World Cycling Championship more than any other country after Belgium. The Giro d'Italia is a world-famous long-distance cycling race held every May, and constitutes one of the three Grand Tours, along with the Tour de France and the Vuelta a España, each of which last approximately three weeks.
Tennis has a significant following near courts and on television. Italian professional tennis players are almost always in the top 100 world ranking of male and female players. Beach tennis with paddle racquet was invented by Italians, and is practised by many people across the country.
Volleyball is played by a lot of amateur players and professional players compete in the Italian Volleyball League, regarded as the best and most difficult volleyball league in the world. The male and female national teams are often in the top 4 ranking of teams in the world.
Athletics is a popular sport for Italians, as the Italian World and Olympic champions are very celebrated people.
In wrestling, one of the most remarkable wrestlers is Bruno Sammartino, who held the record of the WWWF (World) Heavyweight Championship for over 11 years across two reigns, the first of which is the longest single reign in the promotion's history.

Rugby union was imported from France in the 1910s and has been regularly played since the 1920s; the National team has progressed slowly but significantly during the decades and thanks to the good results achieved in the second half of the 1990s, when they managed to beat historical teams like Scotland, Ireland and eventually France, Italy gained the admission to the Five Nation Championship, later renamed Six Nations; Italy has taken part to the Rugby World Cup since its inauguration in 1987 and never missed an edition though to date has never gone past the group stage.

Women 

Women in Italy refers to females who are from (or reside in) Italy. The legal and social status of Italian women has undergone rapid transformations and changes during the past decades. This includes family laws, the enactment of anti-discrimination measures, and reforms to the penal code (in particular with regard to crimes of violence against women).

After World War II, women were given the right to vote in 1946 Italian institutional referendum. The new Italian Constitution of 1948 affirmed that women had equal rights. It was not however until the 1970s that women in Italy scored some major achievements with the introduction of laws regulating divorce (1970), abortion (1978), and the approval in 1975 of the new family code. Today, women have the same legal rights as men in Italy, and have mainly the same job, business, and education opportunities.

Nobel Prizes

Ethnogenesis

Due to historic demographic shifts in the Italian peninsula throughout history, its geographical position in the center of the Mediterranean Sea, as well as Italy's regional ethnic diversity since ancient times, modern Italians are genetically diverse. The Iron Age tribes of Italy are pre-Indo-European-speaking peoples, such as the Etruscans, Rhaetians, Camuni, Nuragics, Sicani, Elymians and the Ligures, and pre-Roman Indo-European-speaking peoples, like the Celts (Gauls and Lepontii) mainly in Northern Italy, and Iapygians, the Italic peoples throughout the peninsula (such as the Latino-Faliscans, the Osco-Umbrians, the Sicels and the Veneti), and a significant number of Greeks in Southern Italy and Sicily (Magna Graecia). Sicilians were also influenced by the Arabs, specially during the Emirate of Sicily.

Italians originate mostly from these primary elements and, like the rest of Romance-speaking Southern Europe, share a common Latin heritage and history. There are also elements like the Bronze and Iron Age Middle Eastern admixture, characterized by high frequencies of Iranian and Anatolian Neolithic ancestries, including several other ancient signatures derived ultimately from the Caucasus, with a lower incidence in Northern Italy compared to Central and Southern Italy. Ancient and Medieval North African admixture is also found in mainland Southern Italy and Sardinia, with the highest incidence being in Sicily. In their admixtures, Sicilians and Southern Italians are closest to modern Greeks (as the historical region of Magna Graecia, "Greater Greece", bears witness to), while Northern Italians are closest to the Spaniards and southern French.

Stone Age

The earliest modern humans inhabiting Italy are believed to have been Paleolithic peoples that may have arrived in the Italian Peninsula as early as 35,000 to 40,000 years ago. Italy is believed to have been a major Ice Age refuge from which Paleolithic humans later colonized Europe.

The Neolithic colonization of Europe from Western Asia and the Middle East beginning around 10,000 years ago reached Italy, as most of the rest of the continent although, according to the demic diffusion model, its impact was most in the southern and eastern regions of the European continent.

Indo-European migrations

Starting in the early Bronze Age, the first wave of migrations into Italy of Indo-European-speaking peoples occurred from Central Europe, with the appearance of the Bell Beaker culture. These were later (from the 14th century BC) followed by others that can be identified as Italo-Celts, with the appearance of the Celtic-speaking Canegrate culture and the Italic-speaking Proto-Villanovan culture, both deriving from the Proto-Italo-Celtic Urnfield culture. Recent DNA studies confirmed the arrival of Steppe-related ancestry in Northern Italy to at least 2000 BCE and in Central Italy by 1600 BCE, with this ancestry component increasing through time.

In the Iron Age and late Bronze Age, Celtic-speaking La Tène and Hallstatt cultures spread over a large part of Italy, with related archeological artifacts found as far south as Apulia. Italics occupied northeastern, southern and central Italy: the "West Italic" group (including the Latins) were the first wave. They had cremation burials and possessed advanced metallurgical techniques. Major tribes included the Latins and Falisci in Lazio; the Oenotrians and Italii in Calabria; the Ausones, Aurunci and Opici in Campania; and perhaps the Veneti in Veneto and the Sicels in Sicily. They were followed, and largely displaced by the East Italic (Osco-Umbrians) group.

Pre-Roman

By the beginning of the Iron Age the Etruscans emerged as the dominant civilization on the Italian peninsula. The Etruscans, whose primary home was in Etruria, expanded over a large part of Italy, covering a territory, at its greatest extent, of roughly what is now Tuscany, western Umbria, and northern Lazio, as well as what are now the Po Valley, Emilia-Romagna, south-eastern Lombardy, southern Veneto, and western Campania. On the origins of the Etruscans, the ancient authors report several hypotheses, one of which claims that the Etruscans come from the Aegean Sea. Modern archaeological and genetic research concluded that the Etruscans were autochthonous and they had a genetic profile similar to their Latin neighbors. Both Etruscans and Latins joined firmly the European cluster lacking recent admixture with Anatolia or the Eastern Mediterranean.

The Ligures are said to have been one of the oldest populations in Italy and Western Europe, possibly of Pre-Indo-European origin. According to Strabo they were not Celts, but later became influenced by the Celtic culture of their neighbours, and thus are sometimes referred to as Celticized Ligurians or Celto-Ligurians. Their language had affinities with both Italic (Latin and the Osco-Umbrian languages) and Celtic (Gaulish). They primarily inhabited the regions of Liguria, Piedmont, northern Tuscany, western Lombardy, western Emilia-Romagna and northern Sardinia, but are believed to have once occupied an even larger portion of ancient Italy as far south as Sicily. They were also settled in Corsica and in the Provence region along the southern coast of modern France.

During the Iron Age, prior to Roman rule, the peoples living in the area of modern Italy and the islands were:
 Etruscans (Camunni, Lepontii, Raeti);
 Sicani;
 Elymians;
 Ligures (Apuani, Bagienni, Briniates, Corsi, Friniates, Garuli, Hercates, Ilvates, Insubres, Orobii, Laevi, Lapicini, Marici, Statielli, Taurini);
 Italics (Latins, Falisci, Marsi, Umbri, Volsci, Marrucini, Osci, Aurunci, Ausones, Campanians, Paeligni, Sabines, Bruttii, Frentani, Lucani, Samnites, Pentri, Caraceni, Caudini, Hirpini, Aequi, Fidenates, Hernici, Picentes, Vestini, Morgeti, Sicels, Veneti);
Iapygians (Messapians, Daunians, Peucetians);
 Celts (Allobroges, Ausones, Boii, Carni, Cenomani, Ceutrones, Graioceli, Lepontii, Lingones, Segusini, Senones, Salassi, Veragri, Vertamocorii);
 Greeks of Magna Graecia;
 Sardinians (Nuragic tribes), in Sardinia;

Italy was, throughout the pre-Roman period, predominantly inhabited by Italic tribes who occupied the modern regions of Lazio, Umbria, Marche, Abruzzo, Molise, Campania, Basilicata, Calabria, Apulia and Sicily. Sicily, in addition to having an Italic population in the Sicels, also was inhabited by the Sicani and the Elymians, of uncertain origin. The Veneti, most often regarded as an Italic tribe, chiefly inhabited the Veneto, but extended as far east as Friuli-Venezia Giulia and Istria, and had colonies as far south as Lazio.

Beginning in the 8th century BC, Greeks arrived in Italy and founded cities along the coast of southern Italy and eastern Sicily, which became known as Magna Graecia ("Greater Greece"). The Greeks were frequently at war with the native Italic tribes, but nonetheless managed to Hellenize and assimilate a good portion of the indigenous population located along eastern Sicily and the Southern coasts of the Italian mainland. According to Beloch the number of Greek citizens in south Italy at its greatest extent reached only 80,000–90,000, while the local people subjected by the Greeks were between 400,000 and 600,000. By the 4th and 3rd century BC, Greek power in Italy was challenged and began to decline, and many Greeks were pushed out of peninsular Italy by the native Oscan, Brutti and Lucani tribes.

The Gauls crossed the Alps and invaded northern Italy in the 4th and 3rd centuries BC, settling in the area that became known as Cisalpine Gaul ("Gaul on this side of the Alps"). Although named after the Gauls, the region was mostly inhabited by indigenous tribes, namely the Ligures, Etruscans, Veneti and Euganei. Estimates by Beloch and Brunt suggest that in the 3rd century BC the Gaulish settlers of north Italy numbered between 130,000 and 140,000 out of a total population of about 1.4 million. The Northern half of Cisalpine Gaul was already inhabited by the Celtic Lepontii since the Bronze Age. Speaking about the Alpine region, the Greek historian Strabo, wrote:

According to Pliny and Livy, after the invasion of the Gauls, some of the Etruscans living in the Po Valley sought refuge in the Alps and became known as the Raeti. The Raeti inhabited the region of Trentino-Alto Adige, as well as eastern Switzerland and Tyrol in western Austria. The Ladins of north-eastern Italy and the Romansh people of Switzerland are said to be descended from the Raeti.

Roman

The Romans—who according to legend originally consisted of three ancient tribes: Latins, Sabines and Etruscans—would go on to conquer the whole Italian peninsula. During the Roman period hundreds of cities and colonies were established throughout Italy, including Florence, Turin, Como, Pavia, Padua, Verona, Vicenza, Trieste and many others. Initially many of these cities were colonized by Latins, but later also included colonists belonging to the other Italic tribes who had become Latinized and joined to Rome. After the Roman conquest of Italy "the whole of Italy had become Latinized".

After the Roman conquest of Cisalpine Gaul and the widespread confiscations of Gallic territory, some of the Gaulish population was either killed or expelled. Many colonies were established by the Romans in the former Gallic territory of Cisalpine Gaul, which was then settled by Roman and Italic people. These colonies included Bologna, Modena, Reggio Emilia, Parma, Piacenza, Cremona and Forlì. According to Strabo:

The Boii, the most powerful and numerous of the Gallic tribes, were expelled by the Romans after 191 BC and settled in Bohemia, while the Insubres still lived in Mediolanum in the 1st century BC.

Population movement and exchange among people from different regions was not uncommon during the Roman period. Latin colonies were founded at Ariminum in 268 and at Firmum in 264, while large numbers of Picentes, who previously inhabited the region, were moved to Paestum and settled along the river Silarus in Campania. Between 180 and 179 BC, 47,000 Ligures belonging to the Apuani tribe were removed from their home along the modern Ligurian-Tuscan border and deported to Samnium, an area corresponding to inland Campania, while Latin colonies were established in their place at Pisa, Lucca and Luni. Such population movements contributed to the rapid Romanization and Latinization of Italy.

Middle Ages and modern period

A large Germanic confederation of Sciri, Heruli, Turcilingi and Rugians, led by Odoacer, invaded and settled Italy in 476. They were preceded by Alemanni, including 30,000 warriors with their families, who settled in the Po Valley in 371, and by Burgundians who settled between Northwestern Italy and Southern France in 443. The Germanic tribe of the Ostrogoths led by Theoderic the Great conquered Italy and presented themselves as upholders of Latin culture, mixing Roman culture together with Gothic culture, in order to legitimize their rule amongst Roman subjects who had a long-held belief in the superiority of Roman culture over foreign "barbarian" Germanic culture. Since Italy had a population of several million, the Goths did not constitute a significant addition to the local population. At the height of their power, there were several thousand Ostrogoths in a population of 6 or 7 million. Before them, Radagaisus led tens of thousands of Goths in Italy in 406, though figures may be too high as ancient sources routinely inflated the numbers of tribal invaders. After the Gothic War, which devastated the local population, the Ostrogoths were defeated. Nevertheless, according to Roman historian Procopius of Caesarea, the Ostrogothic population was allowed to live peacefully in Italy with their Rugian allies under Roman sovereignty.

But in the sixth century, another Germanic tribe known as the Longobards invaded Italy, which in the meantime had been reconquered by the East Roman or Byzantine Empire. The Longobards were a small minority compared to the roughly four million people in Italy at the time. They were later followed by the Bavarians and the Franks, who conquered and ruled most of Italy. Some groups of Slavs settled in parts of the northern Italian peninsula between the 7th and the 8th centuries, while Bulgars led by Alcek settled in Sepino, Bojano and Isernia. These Bulgars preserved their speech and identity until the late 8th century.

Following Roman rule, Sicily, Corsica and Sardinia were conquered by the Vandals, then by the Ostrogoths, and finally by the Byzantines. At one point, Sardinia grew increasingly autonomous from the Byzantine rule to the point of organizing itself into four sovereign Kingdoms, known as "Judicates", that would last until the Aragonese conquest in the 15th century. Corsica came under the influence of the Kingdom of the Lombards and later under the maritime Republics of Pisa and Genoa. In 687, Sicily became the Byzantine Theme of Sicily; during the course of the Arab–Byzantine wars, Sicily gradually became the Emirate of Sicily (831–1072). Later, a series of conflicts with the Normans would bring about the establishment of the County of Sicily, and eventually the Kingdom of Sicily. The Lombards of Sicily (not to be confused with the Longobards), coming from Northern Italy, settled in the central and eastern part of Sicily. After the marriage between the Norman Roger I of Sicily and Adelaide del Vasto, descendant of the Aleramici family, many Northern Italian colonisers (known collectively as Lombards) left their homeland, in the Aleramici's possessions in Piedmont and Liguria (then known as Lombardy), to settle on the island of Sicily.

Before them, other Lombards arrived in Sicily, with an expedition departed in 1038, led by the Byzantine commander George Maniakes, which for a very short time managed to snatch Messina and Syracuse from Arab rule. The Lombards who arrived with the Byzantines settled in Maniace, Randazzo and Troina, while a group of Genoese and other Lombards from Liguria settled in Caltagirone.

During the subsequent Swabian rule under the Holy Roman Emperor Frederick II, who spent most of his life as king of Sicily in his court in Palermo, Moors were progressively eradicated until the massive deportation of the last Muslims of Sicily. As a result of the Arab expulsion, many towns across Sicily were left depopulated. By the 12th century, Swabian kings granted immigrants from northern Italy (particularly Piedmont, Lombardy and Liguria), Latium and Tuscany in central Italy, and French regions of Normandy, Provence and Brittany (all collectively known as Lombards.) settlement into Sicily, re-establishing the Latin element into the island, a legacy which can be seen in the many Gallo-Italic dialects and towns found in the interior and western parts of Sicily, brought by these settlers. It is believed that the Lombard immigrants in Sicily over a couple of centuries were a total of about 200,000.

An estimated 20,000 Swabians and 40,000 Normans settled in the southern half of Italy during this period. Additional Tuscan migrants settled in Sicily after the Florentine conquest of Pisa in 1406.

Some of the expelled Muslims were deported to Lucera (Lugêrah, as it was known in Arabic). Their numbers eventually reached between 15,000 and 20,000, leading Lucera to be called Lucaera Saracenorum because it represented the last stronghold of Islamic presence in Italy. The colony thrived for 75 years until it was sacked in 1300 by Christian forces under the command of the Angevin Charles II of Naples. The city's Muslim inhabitants were exiled or sold into slavery, with many finding asylum in Albania across the Adriatic Sea. After the expulsions of Muslims in Lucera, Charles II replaced Lucera's Saracens with Christians, chiefly Burgundian and Provençal soldiers and farmers, following an initial settlement of 140 Provençal families in 1273. A remnant of the descendants of these Provençal colonists, still speaking a Franco-Provençal dialect, has survived until the present day in the villages of Faeto and Celle di San Vito.

Substantial migrations of Lombards to Naples, Rome and Palermo, continued in the 16th and 17th centuries, driven by the constant overcrowding in the north. Beside that, minor but significant settlements of Slavs (the so-called Schiavoni) and Arbereshe in Italy have been recorded, while Scottish soldiers - the Garde Ecossaise - who served the French King, Francis I, settled in the mountains of Piedmont.

The geographical and cultural proximity with Southern Italy pushed Albanians to cross the Strait of Otranto, especially after Skanderbeg's death and the conquest of the Balkans by the Ottomans. In defense of the Christian religion and in search of soldiers loyal to the Spanish crown, Alfonso V of Aragon, also king of Naples, invited Arbereshe soldiers to move to Italy with their families. In return the king guaranteed to Albanians lots of land and a favourable taxation.

Arbereshe and Schiavoni were used to repopulate abandoned villages or villages whose population had died in earthquakes, plagues and other catastrophes. Albanian soldiers were also used to quell rebellions in Calabria. Slavic colonies were established in eastern Friuli, Sicily and Molise (Molise Croats).

Between the Late Middle Ages and the early modern period, there were several waves of immigration of Albanians into Italy, in addition to another in the 20th century. The descendants of these Albanian emigrants, many still retaining the Albanian language, the Arbëresh dialect, have survived throughout southern Italy, numbering about 260,000 people, with roughly 80,000 to 100,000 speaking the Albanian language.

Italian surnames
Most of Italy's surnames (cognomi), with the exception of a few areas marked by linguistic minorities, derive from Italian and arose from an individual's peculiar (physical, etc.) qualities (e.g. Rossi, Bianchi, Quattrocchi, Mancini, Grasso, etc.), occupation (Ferrari, Auditore, Sartori, Tagliabue, etc.), relation of fatherhood or lack thereof (De Pretis, Orfanelli, Esposito, Trovato, etc.), and geographic location (Padovano, Pisano, Leccese, Lucchese, etc.). Some of them also indicate a remote foreign origin (Greco, Tedesco, Moro, Albanese, etc.).

Italian diaspora

Italian migration outside Italy took place, in different migrating cycles, for centuries. A diaspora in high numbers took place after Italy's unification in 1861 and continued through 1914 with the beginning of the First World War. This rapid outflow and migration of Italian people across the globe can be attributed to factors such as the internal economic slump that emerged alongside Italy's unification, family, and the industrial boom that occurred in the world surrounding Italy.

Italy after its unification did not seek nationalism but sought work instead. However, a unified state did not automatically constitute a sound economy. The global economic expansion, ranging from Britain's Industrial Revolution in the late 18th and through mid 19th century, to the use of slave labor in the Americas did not hit Italy until much later (with the exception of the "industrial triangle" between Milan, Genoa and Turin) This lag resulted in a deficit of work available in Italy and the need to look for work elsewhere. The mass industrialization and urbanization globally resulted in higher labor mobility and the need for Italians to stay anchored to the land for economic support declined.

Moreover, better opportunities for work were not the only incentive to move; family played a major role and the dispersion of Italians globally. Italians were more likely to migrate to countries where they had family established beforehand. These ties are shown to be stronger in many cases than the monetary incentive for migration, taking into account a familial base and possibly an Italian migrant community, greater connections to find opportunities for work, housing etc. Thus, thousands of Italian men and women left Italy and dispersed around the world and this trend only increased as the First World War approached.

Notably, it was not as if Italians had never migrated before; internal migration between North and Southern Italy before unification was common. Northern Italy caught on to industrialization sooner than Southern Italy, therefore it was considered more modern technologically, and tended to be inhabited by the bourgeoisie. Alternatively, rural and agro-intensive Southern Italy was seen as economically backward and was mainly populated by lower class peasantry. Given these disparities, prior to unification (and arguably after) the two sections of Italy, North and South were essentially seen by Italians and other nations as separate countries. So, migrating from one part of Italy to next could be seen as though they were indeed migrating to another country or even continent.

Furthermore, large-scale migrations phenomena did not recede until the late 1920s, well into the Fascist regime, and a subsequent wave can be observed after the end of the Second World War. Another wave is currently happening due to the ongoing debt crisis.

Over 80 million people of full or part Italian descent live outside Europe, with about 50 million living in South America (mostly in Brazil, which has the largest number of Italian descendants outside Italy, and Argentina, where over 62.5% of the population have at least one Italian ancestor), about 23 million living in North America (United States and Canada) and 1 million in Oceania (Australia and New Zealand). Others live in other parts of Europe (primarily the United Kingdom, Germany, France and Switzerland).

A historical Italian community has also existed in Gibraltar since the 16th century. To a lesser extent, people of full or partial Italian descent are also found in Africa (most notably in the former Italian colonies of Eritrea, which has 100,000 descendants, Somalia, Libya, Ethiopia, and in others countries such as South Africa, with 77,400 descendants, Tunisia and Egypt), in the Middle East (in recent years the United Arab Emirates has maintained a desirable destination for Italian immigrants, with currently 10,000 Italian immigrants), and Asia (Singapore is home to a sizeable Italian community).

Regarding the diaspora, there are many individuals of Italian descent who are possibly eligible for Italian citizenship by method of jus sanguinis, which is from the Latin meaning "by blood". However, just having Italian ancestry is not enough to qualify for Italian citizenship. To qualify, one must have at least one Italian-born citizen ancestor who, after emigrating from Italy to another country, had passed citizenship onto their children before they naturalized as citizens of their newly adopted country. The Italian government does not have a rule regarding on how many generations born outside of Italy can claim Italian nationality.

Geographic distribution of Italian speakers 

The majority of Italian nationals are native speakers of the country's official language, Italian, or a variety thereof, that is regional Italian. However, many of them also speak a regional or minority language native to Italy, the existence of which predates the national language. Although there is disagreement on the total number, according to UNESCO, there are approximately 30 languages native to Italy, although many are often misleadingly referred to as "Italian dialects".

Italian is an official language of Italy and San Marino and is spoken fluently by the majority of the countries' populations. Italian is the third most spoken language in Switzerland (after German and French), though its use there has moderately declined since the 1970s. It is official both on the national level and on regional level in two cantons: Ticino and the Grisons. In the latter canton, however, it is only spoken by a small minority, in the Italian Grisons. Ticino, which includes Lugano, the largest Italian-speaking city outside Italy, is the only canton where Italian is predominant. Italian is also used in administration and official documents in Vatican City. 

Italian is also spoken by a minority in Monaco and France, especially in the southeastern part of the country. Italian was the official language in Savoy and in Nice until 1860, when they were both annexed by France under the Treaty of Turin, a development that triggered the "Niçard exodus", or the emigration of a quarter of the Niçard Italians to Italy, and the Niçard Vespers. Italian was the official language of Corsica until 1859. Italian is generally understood in Corsica by the population resident therein who speak Corsican, which is an Italo-Romance idiom similar to Tuscan. Italian was the official language in Monaco until 1860, when it was replaced by the French. This was due to the annexation of the surrounding County of Nice to France following the Treaty of Turin (1860).

It formerly had official status in Montenegro (because of the Venetian Albania), parts of Slovenia and Croatia (because of the Venetian Istria and Venetian Dalmatia), parts of Greece (because of the Venetian rule in the Ionian Islands and by the Kingdom of Italy in the Dodecanese). Italian is widely spoken in Malta, where nearly two-thirds of the population can speak it fluently. Italian served as Malta's official language until 1934, when it was abolished by the British colonial administration amid strong local opposition. Italian language in Slovenia is an officially recognized minority language in the country. The official census, carried out in 2002, reported 2,258 ethnic Italians (Istrian Italians) in Slovenia (0.11% of the total population). Italian language in Croatia is an official minority language in the country, with many schools and public announcements published in both languages. The 2001 census in Croatia reported 19,636 ethnic Italians (Istrian Italians and Dalmatian Italians) in the country (some 0.42% of the total population). Their numbers dropped dramatically after World War II following the Istrian–Dalmatian exodus, which caused the emigration of between 230,000 and 350,000 Istrian Italians and Dalmatian Italians. Italian was the official language of the Republic of Ragusa from 1492 to 1807.

It formerly had official status in Albania due to the annexation of the country to the Kingdom of Italy (1939–1943). Albania has a large population of non-native speakers, with over half of the population having some knowledge of the Italian language. The Albanian government has pushed to make Italian a compulsory second language in schools. The Italian language is well-known and studied in Albania, due to its historical ties and geographical proximity to Italy and to the diffusion of Italian television in the country. 

Due to heavy Italian influence during the Italian colonial period, Italian is still understood by some in former colonies. Although it was the primary language in Libya since colonial rule, Italian greatly declined under the rule of Muammar Gaddafi, who expelled the Italian Libyan population and made Arabic the sole official language of the country. A few hundred Italian settlers returned to Libya in the 2000s.

Italian was the official language of Eritrea during Italian colonisation. Italian is today used in commerce, and it is still spoken especially among elders; besides that, Italian words are incorporated as loan words in the main language spoken in the country (Tigrinya). The capital city of Eritrea, Asmara, still has several Italian schools, established during the colonial period. In the early 19th century, Eritrea was the country with the highest number of Italians abroad, and the Italian Eritreans grew from 4,000 during World War I to nearly 100,000 at the beginning of World War II. In Asmara there are two Italian schools, the Italian School of Asmara (Italian primary school with a Montessori department) and the Liceo Sperimentale "G. Marconi" (Italian international senior high school).

Italian was also introduced to Somalia through colonialism and was the sole official language of administration and education during the colonial period but fell out of use after government, educational and economic infrastructure were destroyed in the Somali Civil War.

Italian is also spoken by large immigrant and expatriate communities in the Americas and Australia. Although over 17 million Americans are of Italian descent, only a little over one million people in the United States speak Italian at home. Nevertheless, an Italian language media market does exist in the country. In Canada, Italian is the second most spoken non-official language when varieties of Chinese are not grouped together, with 375,645 claiming Italian as their mother tongue in 2016.

Italian immigrants to South America have also brought a presence of the language to that continent. According to some sources, Italian is the second most spoken language in Argentina after the official language of Spanish, although its number of speakers, mainly of the older generation, is decreasing. Italian bilingual speakers can be found in the Southeast of Brazil as well as in the South, corresponding to 2.07% of the total population of the country. In Venezuela, Italian is the most spoken language after Spanish and Portuguese, with around 200,000 speakers. In Uruguay, people that speak Italian as their home language is 1.1% of the total population of the country. In Australia, Italian is the second most spoken foreign language after Chinese, with 1.4% of the population speaking it as their home language.

The main Italian-language newspapers published outside Italy are the L'Osservatore Romano (Vatican City), the L'Informazione di San Marino (San Marino), the Corriere del Ticino and the laRegione Ticino (Switzerland), the La Voce del Popolo (Croatia), the Corriere d'Italia (Germany), the L'italoeuropeo (United Kingdom), the Passaparola (Luxembourg), the America Oggi (United States), the Corriere Canadese and the Corriere Italiano (Canada), the Il punto d'incontro (Mexico), the L'Italia del Popolo (Argentina), the Fanfulla (Brazil), the Gente d'Italia (Uruguay), the La Voce d'Italia (Venezuela), the Il Globo (Australia) and the La gazzetta del Sud Africa (South Africa).

See also

 Demographics of Italy
 Sicilians
 Sardinians
 Ladins
 List of Italians
 List of Sardinians
 List of Sicilians
 Sammarinese

Notes

References

Sources

Bibliography
 
 
 
 
 
 
 

Ethnic groups in Italy
 
Romance peoples